Barambu is Zande language spoken in the northeast of the Democratic Republic of the Congo.
It is spoken by the Barambu people.

References

Languages of the Democratic Republic of the Congo
Zande languages